Belgrade Fashion Week is a fashion show held in Belgrade, Serbia twice a year. It is the largest event of its kind in the country. Attracting international buyers and industry experts, the show has helped launch the careers of several Serbian fashion designers, such as George Styler, Ivana Pilja, Ana Ljubinkovic, and Boris Nikolic. British designer Roksanda Ilincic, who is originally from Serbia, has regularly presented her collections at the show since 2002. Italian Vogue has called the festival "... the most interesting platform in the Balkans for designers and international buyers".

About
Belgrade Fashion Week was founded in 1996 by Nenad Radujević who is also the festival's director.  The first fashion week to be held in Eastern Europe, it is supported by local media sponsorship and companies such as Textil distribution center and Matrix hair salons. Belgrade Fashion Week takes place twice a year, at the end of October and in March, and lasts about two weeks. It is mainly held at the Belexpocentar, a conference hall located in New Belgrade. Other venues are also employed, such as various galleries for the "Fashion and Art" segment or the Museum of Applied Arts for accompanying exhibitions.

The primary goal of the event is to support local talent and young designers by promoting them in Serbia, as well as internationally, and also by combining the artistic and commercial aspects of fashion. The show also presents designers from Croatia, Slovenia and Macedonia in the "Fashion Scout SEE" contest, which is judged by European fashion industry experts.

Highlights
Belgrade Fashion Week features numerous activities that are related to the fashion industry. In 2006, students from Belgrade's Academy of Fine Arts were asked to present their designs. In 2009, a one-off competition was held to design the uniforms of the pavilion staff representing Serbia at Expo 2010 Shanghai. In 2012, Belgrade Fashion Week launched project "Zone 45", aimed at showcasing the best designers from the surrounding countries and further developing a fashion scene in the region. In 2014, Indian designer Manish Arora was a special guest at the show, with the support of the Indian Embassy in Belgrade, Etihad Airways and Air Serbia.

The "Fashion Scout SEE" competition was introduced in 2017. The jury consisted of British fashion editor Hilary Alexander, the Italian director of Rome's "Academia Costume e Moda" Adrien Yakimov Roberts, and Martyn Roberts who founded London's Fashion Scout showcase. The winner, Serbian designer Nevena Ivanovic, got to compete in London Fashion Week's "Ones to Watch" program, a contest that supports emerging designers. According to Hilary Alexander, the event "...raises the profile of fashion for the whole region – with the winner being awarded the opportunity to show on the catwalk during London Fashion Week and thus potentially be seen by press and buyers from the UK, US, Asia and Europe".

In 2017, the show introduced "BFW Choice", a new concept in sales that supports local designers through pop-up shops. In 2018, Belgrade Fashion Week had a special show featuring local designers whose clothing lines were purchased by Serbian department store Martini Vesto. Serbian pop singer Ana Stanic performed during the show wearing one of the mentioned designs.

In 2018, several designers from the Belgrade show were profiled at London Fashion Week, in an event called "Belgrade Fashion Week Showcase". In addition, Serbian womenswear designer Ana Ljubinkovic presented her collection in London's "Ones to Watch" contest.

In 2018, the Belgrade Fashion Week commemorated Serbian fashion designer Boris Nikolic who had died ten years earlier. An award is also named in his honour.

Competition prizes
The following prizes are handed out at each Belgrade Fashion Week:
 Boris Nikolić Award 
 Belgrade Fashion Week Special Prize
 Bazart Award for Best Collection
 Award for Style Personality
 Textile Young Designer Award
 Best Model BFW
 Best Male Model BFW  
 Beauty and Health Prize for Best Make-up  
 Beauty and Health Prize for Best Hairstyle
 Wannabe Magazine Award for Best Digital Presentation 
 Insta Shot Award for Young Photographers
 Gloria Glam Award

Serbian designers
Roksanda Ilincic
Aleksandra Lalić
Ivana Pilja
Ana Ljubinković
Nevena Ivanović, fashion brand "NEO Design"
Evica Milovanov-Penezic
Boris Nikolić
Ines Janković
Sonja Jocić
Marijana Matthäus
Bojana Sentaler
Ana Kras
George Styler
Zoran Ladicorbic
Daniel Vosovic
Gorjana Reidel
Jelena Behrend
Ana Rajcevic
Melina Džinović, fashion brand "Hamel"
Aleksandar Protić
Ana Šekularac
Verica Rakocević
Ivana Sert
Mihailo Anušić, fashion brand "Mihano Momosa"
Bata Spasojević
Zvonko Marković

See also
 Serbia Fashion Week
 London Fashion Week
 Belgrade Design Week
 The Applied Artists and Designers Association of Serbia

External links
 Official website

References 

March events
October events
Events in Belgrade
Fashion events in Serbia
Annual events in Serbia
Spring (season) events in Serbia
Fashion weeks
International conferences
Design awards
Festivals in Serbia
Recurring events established in 1996
1996 establishments in Serbia